Darren Michael Bradley (born 24 November 1965 in Kings Norton, England) is an English former professional footballer, who played as a midfielder for Aston Villa, West Bromwich Albion and Walsall. He also represented England at youth level.

Aston Villa

Darren first came to notice to Villa scouts while at secondary school in Kings Norton, before signing for the Villans as an apprentice in 1983. Darren went on to break into the first team at Villa, making 20 appearances.

West Bromwich Albion

Darren moved to The Hawthorns on 14 March 1986, in a deal that saw Stephen Hunt move in the opposite direction. He went on to spend the majority of his career at West Brom, becoming the captain of the club. Though not a prolific goalscorer, Darren is best remembered amongst West Brom fans for a spectacular 30-yard goal against archrivals Wolverhampton Wanderers, helping them to a 3–2 victory in the Black Country derby in August 1993. For his efforts in the 1992–1993 season, Darren was voted into the PFA team of the year.

Walsall

After being released by manager Alan Buckley in 1995, Darren spent two years at Walsall before retiring in 1997.

After retirement

Since retirement, Darren has played for Aston Villa Old Stars, a charity fund-raising football team.

Darren became involved in launching Intergarage in 2000, a business designing and manufacturing underground garages, where he is currently a Sales Director.

Honours
Individual
PFA Team of the Year: 1992–93 Second Division

References

External links

English footballers
People from Kings Norton
Aston Villa F.C. players
West Bromwich Albion F.C. players
Walsall F.C. players
1965 births
Living people
Association football midfielders